Johnny English is a series of spy action comedy films parodying the James Bond secret agent genre. It features Rowan Atkinson as the title character, based on the screenplay written by Neal Purvis, Robert Wade and William Davies. The series includes three instalments: Johnny English (2003), Johnny English Reborn (2011), and Johnny English Strikes Again (2018).

The series is infused with comedy similar to Atkinson's Mr. Bean character, and has grossed $479.6 million worldwide, despite generally mixed critical reviews.

Films

Johnny English (2003) 

Johnny English, an incompetent MI7 office worker, is promoted to top agent and tasked to investigate the theft of the Crown Jewels.

Johnny English Reborn (2011) 

Five years after a failed mission that cost him his knighthood, Johnny English is brought back to the MI7 to investigate a group of assassins known as Vortex.

Johnny English Strikes Again (2018) 

Johnny English is tasked to investigate cyber attacks launched in the United Kingdom.

Future 
In a Reddit AMA thread in October of 2018, when asked about more Johnny English films, Rowan Atkinson replied with: "I doubt it but thank you very much for implying you'd like to see another one. But at the same time...never say never ;)".

Cast

Crew

Reception

Box office performance

Critical and public response

See also
 Outline of James Bond

References

External links
 

Action film series
Adventure film series
 
British film series
Comedy film series
Spy film series
Film series introduced in 2003
Universal Pictures franchises
Parody films based on James Bond films
Trilogies
Rowan Atkinson